Hard Knocks (also known as Mid-Knight Rider and Hollywood Knight) is a 1979 American film starring Michael Christian and directed by David Worth.

Plot
Guy, a young male prostitute, comes to Hollywood and encounters much more than he bargained for.

Cast
Michael Christian - Guy 
Josette Banzet - Cherie 
Keenan Wynn - Jed 
Donna Wilkes - Chris 
John Crawford - Josh 
Henry Brandon - Curley

References

External links

Film review

1979 films
Films about male prostitution in the United States
Films directed by David Worth (cinematographer)
1970s English-language films
American drama films
1970s American films